BS 8599 is a technical standard published by the British Standards Institution listing recommended contents of first aid kits for workplaces and motor vehicles.

References 

First aid